Edward Dickson (1854–1903) was a merchant and political figure in Manitoba. He represented Lansdowne from 1888 to 1896 in the Legislative Assembly of Manitoba as a Liberal.

The son of Thomas Dickson, a resident of Russell Township, Canada West, he worked in the lumber trade in Ontario before coming west to Winnipeg in 1881 as a bookkeeper for the Canadian Pacific Railway. Dickson operated a supply store in Oak Lake. He also served as a justice of the peace, as county clerk and as the first reeve for the Rural Municipality of Sifton. In 1890, he married  Emma May Horsman.

Dickson developed a formula for smokeless gunpowder, forming the Robin Hood Powder Company in 1900. He went on to  establish the Robin Hood Arms Factory, which was later bought by Remington, in Swanton, Vermont. Dickson died in Swanton in 1903.

References 

1854 births
1903 deaths
Manitoba Liberal Party MLAs